Aws ibn Qallam ibn Batina ibn Jumayhir al-Lihyani was the fourth king of al-Hirah, he reigned in 363–368, interrupting the succession of the city's Lakhmid rulers.

He was the scion of a noble Christian Arab family. One of his relatives built a church, and one of his descendants was Jabir ibn Sham'on, the bishop of al-Hira. Aws was the one who brought the family of Uday ibn Zayd to al-Hira. Aws was killed by the Lakhmid nobleman Juhjuban ibn Atik al-Lakhmi during the latter's revolt.

References

Arab Christians in Mesopotamia
Lakhmid kings
4th-century monarchs in the Middle East
4th-century Arabs